The 2007 USA Outdoor Track and Field Championships was organised by USA Track & Field and held from June 20 to 24 at the IU Michael A. Carroll Track & Soccer Stadium in Indianapolis, Indiana. The four-day competition served as the national championships in track and field for the United States and also the trials for the 2007 World Championships in Athletics.

It was the fifth time that the stadium in Indianapolis had held the combined gender national track and field event, and the second time consecutively following its hosting of the 2006 edition. The USA Junior Championships were held in conjunction with the event and Rynell Parson set a world youth best of 10.22 to win the men's 100 m.

Athletes that finished in the top three of their event and held the IAAF qualifying standard were eligible to represent the United States at the 2007 World Championships. The United States was able to send three athletes per event to the competition, excluding any American reigning world champions, who received automatic qualification separate from the national selection. The World Championships national selection for the marathon and 50 kilometres walk were incorporated into the discrete national championship meets for those events. Selection for the relay races were made by committee.

Eight Americans went on to win an individual gold medal at the 2007 World Championships. Double sprint national champion Tyson Gay (the only athlete to win two national titles that year) repeated that feat with 100 m and 200 m world title wins. The 5000 m national champion Bernard Lagat won both that event and the 1500 m at the World Championships. Gay, Lagat, Brad Walker, Reese Hoffa, and Allyson Felix were the five athletes to win both national and world titles that year. Jeremy Wariner and Michelle Perry defended their world titles despite not winning their specialities nationally that year. Kerron Clement was runner-up in the men's 400 m hurdles in Indianapolis, but was unmatched at the World Championships in Osaka.

Several athletes extended their unbeaten runs at national level. Khadevis Robinson had a third straight win in the men's 800 m. Men's javelin thrower Breaux Greer had an eighth straight win. Treniere Clement had her third win over 1500 m, while Dana Pounds brought an end to Kim Kreiner's unbeaten run in the women's javelin, which dated back to 2004.

Results
Key:

Men track events

Men field events

Women track events

Women field events

World Championships qualification

Automatic byes
A total of ten American athletes received automatic byes into the 2007 World Championships in Athletics as a result of their being the defending champions from the 2005 World Championships in Athletics. Justin Gatlin was the reigning world champion in the men's 100 m and 200 m but was ineligible for competition due to a doping ban.

Lauryn Williams: women's 100 meters
Allyson Felix: women's 200 meters
Jeremy Wariner: men's 400 meters
Michelle Perry: women's 100 m hurdles
Bershawn Jackson: men's 400 m hurdles
Dwight Phillips: men's long jump
Tianna Madison: women's long jump
Walter Davis: men's triple jump
Adam Nelson: men's shot put
Bryan Clay: men's decathlon

Non-top three selections
College runners Trindon Holliday and Walter Dix, who both placed top three in the men's 100 m opted not to compete at the World Championships, with fourth and fifth placers Mark Jelks and J-Mee Samuels taking their places. Joint runner-up in the men's high jump, Adam Shunk, did not achieve the qualifying mark and fourth place Jesse Williams was selected instead. Eight place finisher in the men's javelin, Eric Brown, was one of only two Americans with the qualifying standard and thus gained selection.

As Dwight Phillips won the national long jump while receiving a bye as defending world champion, the fourth placer Walter Davis was the United States' fourth selection for that event. Kenta Bell – who finished third but failed a doping test at the championships – was the fourth choice for the men's triple jump (in which Davis was defending champion) as he was the only other American with the standard and his three-month doping ban expired before the World Championships. Noah Bryant was fourth in the men's shot put and gained selection due to reigning world champion Adam Nelson's bye.

Allyson Felix was fourth in the 100 m but gained selection as Lauryn Williams already qualified as world champion. LaShauntea Moore entered the 200 m on the same basis, due to Felix's own world champion bye, while 100 m hurdles fourth placer Nichole Denby benefited from Michelle Perry's bye.

Erin Aldrich was only seventh in the women's high jump, but took America's second spot as the only other athlete with the standard. Joint third placers in the pole vault, Lacy Janson and Jillian Schwartz had both achieved a qualifying mark of 4.50 m that year, but selectors opted to choose Schwartz for the national team. Cecilia Barnes, fourth place in the women's discus, got preference over third place Summer Pierson due to the former having the standard.

References

Results
Full Results - Open . USATF. Retrieved on 2015-06-27.
Day reports
Dunaway, James (2007-06-22). Greer again – 91.29 in the Javelin as U.S. Championships begin - Day One. IAAF. Retrieved on 2015-06-27.
Dunaway, James (2007-06-23). Gay runs 9.84 world season lead into the wind – US Champs, Day 2. IAAF. Retrieved on 2015-06-27.
Dunaway, James (2007-06-24). Trotter & Hastings inside 50 sec, as Richards is swept out of Osaka 400m berth – US Champs, Day 3. IAAF. Retrieved on 2015-06-27.
Dunaway, James (2007-06-24). Gay runs 19.62, the second fastest 200m in history – USA Champs, Day 4 . IAAF. Retrieved on 2015-06-27.

USA Outdoor Track and Field Championships
USA Outdoors
Track, Outdoor
Sports competitions in Indianapolis
USA Outdoor Track and Field Championships
Track and field in Indiana